Friden may refer to:

People 
 Anders Fridén (born 1973), Swedish vocalist and songwriter
 Carl Friden (1891–1945), Swedish-born, American mechanical engineer and businessman
 Yue Xia Wang Fridén (born 1962), Swedish-Chinese table tennis player

Other uses 
 Friden, Inc., an American company
 Friden, Derbyshire, a village in England